Townsend Township, Ohio may refer to:

Townsend Township, Huron County, Ohio
Townsend Township, Sandusky County, Ohio

Ohio township disambiguation pages